33rd National Board of Review Awards
December 19, 1961
The 33rd National Board of Review Awards were announced on December 19, 1961.

Top Ten Films 
Question 7
The Hustler
West Side Story
The Innocents
Hoodlum Priest
Summer and Smoke
The Young Doctors
Judgment at Nuremberg
One, Two, Three
Fanny

Top Foreign Films 
The Bridge
La Dolce Vita
Two Women
Saturday Night and Sunday Morning
A Summer to Remember

Winners 
 Best Film: Question 7
 Best Foreign Film: The Bridge
 Best Actor: Albert Finney (Saturday Night and Sunday Morning)
 Best Actress: Geraldine Page (Summer and Smoke)
 Best Supporting Actor: Jackie Gleason (The Hustler)
 Best Supporting Actress: Ruby Dee (A Raisin in the Sun)
 Best Director: Jack Clayton (The Innocents)

External links 
 National Board of Review of Motion Pictures :: Awards for 1961

1961
National Board of Review Awards
National Board of Review Awards
National Board of Review Awards
National Board of Review Awards